The Ministry of Diaspora Affairs is a government ministry in Israel. As a ministerial post in the Israeli cabinet, it has gone under several different names and was combined with the Jerusalem portfolio between 2013 and 2015. Between June and November 2005 there was also a Deputy Minister.

List of portfolio holders

Deputy ministers

References

External links

Israel based opposition to antisemitism
Government of Israel
Diaspora
Diaspora ministries
Jewish diaspora
Israeli diaspora
1999 establishments in Israel